Manisha Ramadass (born 27 January 2005) is an Indian professional para-badminton player. Having made her international debut in 2022, she became world number 1 in the SU5 category on 22 August 2022. She won her first title at the Spanish (level 2) Para-Badminton International in 2022. She currently lives in Chennai, Tamil Nadu.

Awards

Achievements

World Championships 
Women's singles

Women's doubles

BWF Para Badminton World Circuit (11 titles) 
The BWF Para Badminton World Circuit – Grade 2, Level 1, 2 and 3 tournaments has been sanctioned by the Badminton World Federation from 2022.

Women's singles

Women's doubles

Mixed doubles

References 

2005 births
Living people
Paralympic athletes of India
Indian disabled sportspeople
Indian female badminton players
Disabled
Sports
Indian female para-badminton players